Statistics of Latvian Higher League in the 1961 season.

Overview
It was contested by 8 teams, and ASK won the championship, winning all of their games.

League standings

References 
 RSSSF

Latvian SSR Higher League
Football 
Latvia